Francis Ogilvy-Grant may refer to:
 Francis Ogilvy-Grant, 6th Earl of Seafield, Scottish nobleman and politician
 Francis Ogilvy-Grant, 10th Earl of Seafield, Scottish peer